The Twenty-Eighth Legislature of the Territory of Hawaii was a session of the Hawaii Territorial Legislature.  The session convened in Honolulu, Hawaii, and ran from February 16 until April 29, 1955.  The majority of members of this Legislature were elected during the Hawaii Democratic Revolution of 1954.

Legislative sessions
A regular session ran from February 16 until April 29, 1955. It passed 277 bills into law.

A special session ran from September 17 until September 25, 1956.  It passed two bills into law, including Act 2, which provided compensation for public school officials.

Senators

House of Representatives

References

Hawaii legislative sessions